The Bischöfliches Gymnasium Petrinum is a Catholic private school of the Diocese of Linz situated on the slopes of Poestlingberg hill in Urfahr, which is a part of Linz.

History 

On 2 July 1896 the building works began. The imposing structure, which is said to have nearly a thousand windows, housed the Gymnasium and an associated boarding home. The institution, originally thought to educated future priests and prepare them for their time at the seminary, soon became one of the leading schools in Upper Austria. 
In 1903 it was visited by the emperor Franz Joseph I.

During World War I, the school was used as a military hospital, which caused the erection of the Kriegerfriedhof (cemetery for dead soldiers).
After the Anschluss of Austria by Germany in 1938, Hitler planned to turn the school into a technical college These plans forced the disruption of the studies at Petrinum, but were never finally carried out.
After World War II, at first the red army occupied the house, the regular education being resumed only not until 1946.

The boarding home is now closed, the school being co-educational since 1993.

Notable alumni

Alois Brandstetter – Austrian writer
Rudolf Habringer – Austrian writer, journalist, comedian and pianist
Augustinus Franz Kropfreiter – Austrian composer
Josef Pühringer – governor of Upper-Austria
Franz Rieger  – Austrian writer
Manfred Scheuer – Bishop of Linz
Peter Paul Wiplinger – Austrian writer and photographer

External links
Homepage of the Verband der Altpetriner

Schools in Linz